Nathan Pritikin (August 29, 1915 – February 21, 1985) was an American inventor, engineer, nutritionist and longevity researcher. He promoted the Pritikin diet, a high-carbohydrate low-fat diet combined with regular aerobic exercise.

Biography

The eldest son born to Jacob and Ester, Pritikin was born and raised in Chicago, Illinois, he was given a scholarship to the University of Chicago and attended from 1933 to 1935, dropping out because of the Depression and starting his own business Flash Foto.  He became an inventor and a millionaire developing patents for companies such as Honeywell, General Electric and Bendix while living in Chicago. He later moved the company to Santa Barbara, California in the 1950s. Pritikin retired in 1966 and devoted his attention solely to longevity institute.

Pritikin Diet

After being diagnosed with ischemic posterior wall heart disease in 1957 via an abnormal ECG and stress test combined with elevated cholesterol, he began searching for a treatment. Based on studies indicating that people in primitive cultures with primarily vegetarian lifestyles had little history of heart disease and western cancers, and medical data available during WW2 detailing rates of disease in various countries he created a low-fat diet that was high in unrefined carbohydrates like vegetables, fruits, beans, whole grains, small amounts of lean meat and low-fat dairy products along with a moderate aerobic exercise regime. His dietary and exercise regime is called the Pritikin Diet.

The Pritikin diet is low in cholesterol and sodium and in total is 5-10% fat, 10-15% protein and 80% carbohydrate.  Protein consumption is limited to 3.5 ounces of lean meat daily which reduces total cholesterol and fat intake. Pritikin promoted his diet to prevent and treat atherosclerosis, diabetes, gout, high-blood pressure and other diseases. The American Medical Association have questioned the effectiveness of the diet for the diseases it is supposed to prevent and have warned that the low calcium and iron intake may make it unsuitable for pregnant women.

Death

Pritikin was diagnosed with leukemia in 1958, and it had been in remission until early 1980s when he began to suffer severe pain and complications from the disease and associated treatments. Despite this he was fully active until a few weeks before death. He committed suicide at Albany Medical Center on  Per a letter to the editor, at autopsy it is claimed that there was a near absence of atherosclerosis (only some fatty streaks), and that the heart's pumping function was completely uncompromised.

Selected publications

Articles
Pritikin, Nathan. (1976). High Carbohydrate Diets: Maligned and Misunderstood. The Journal of Applied Nutrition 28 (3&4): 56-68.

Books
 Live Longer Now: The First One Hundred Years of Your Life: The 2100 Program. Grosset & Dunlap.  co-authored with Jon N. Leonard and Jack L. Hofer (1974).
 The Pritikin Program for Diet and Exercise. Bantam.  co-authored with  Patrick M. McGrady (1979).
 The Pritikin Permanent Weight Loss Manual. Bantam.  (1981).
 The Pritikin Promise: 28 Days to a Longer, Healthier Life. Simon & Schuster.   (1983).
 Diet for Runners: The High-Performance Diet that Gives You Supercharged Energy and Endurance  (1985).
 Pritikin: The Man Who Healed America's Heart  Tom Monte, Ilene Pritikin (1987).

References

External links
 Nathan Pritikin papers - Online Archive California

1915 births
1985 suicides
20th-century American non-fiction writers
American health and wellness writers
American nutritionists
High-fiber diet advocates
Suicides by sharp instrument in the United States
Writers from Chicago
Writers from Santa Barbara, California